Victims and Murderers is a 2000 Czech drama film directed by Andrea Sedláčková. It was entered into the 23rd Moscow International Film Festival.

Cast
 Karel Roden as Miroslav
 Ivana Chýlková as Jana
 Monika Hilmerová as Young Jana
 Vladimír Skultéty as Young Miroslav
 Veronika Jeníková as Olga
 Daniela Kolářová as Mother
 Ján Sedal as Father
 Janko Kroner as Josef
 Bohumil Klepl as Ludvík (as Bob Klepl)
 Jiří Štěpnička as Doubrava
 Simona Stašová as Doubravová
 Anna Duchanová as Katerina
 Veronika Bellova as Lucie

References

External links
 

2000 films
2000 drama films
2000s Czech-language films
Czech drama films
2000s Czech films